Sphingnotus mirabilis is a species of beetle belonging to the family Cerambycidae.

Description 
Head, prothorax and elitra have a brilliant metallic blue colour. Elyra bears two trasversal whitish or azure bands.

Distribution
This species can be found in New Guinea.

List of subspecies
Sphingnotus mirabilis admirabilis Kriesche, 1923
Sphingnotus mirabilis keyensis Schwarzer, 1924
Sphingnotus mirabilis mirabilis (Boisduval, 1835)
Sphingnotus mirabilis mniszechi Perroud, 1855
Sphingnotus mirabilis salomonum Breuning, 1945
Sphingnotus mirabilis splendens Gressitt, 1984

References
 Biolib
 mirabilis F. VITALI – Cerambycoidea

External links
 Sphingnotus mirabilis splendens on Papua Insects

Tmesisternini
Beetles described in 1835